Snowspeed  is a gravity powered snow sledge that has been designed to beat the world speed record.

Its design deliberately resembles Formula 1 racing cars because this will help it achieve speeds of up to 250km/h (155mph).

The current speed record is held by Guy Martin, who achieved 134.36km/h (83.49mph) in 2014.

The sledge has been created by a team of Norwegian speed enthusiasts, led by designer Nima Shahinian, journalist Jorn Madslien and entrepreneur Tom Ruud.

Tests have been carried out at [Toyota Motorsport GmbH] - TMG, the current second-best endurance motor racing team in the world.

Early tests revealed that the Snowspeed prototype III design needed a bit more rear-end stability, and those adjustments are the team's focus during 2016, before an attempt on the record is due to be made towards the end of winter 2017.

References

External links
 Snowspeed

Snow